Free TV is an Italian regional television channel of Friuli-Venezia Giulia owned by T-Vision. It transmits a light entertainment program: movies, news and weather bulletins on LCN 17.

Other channels of own group are Antenna 3 and Ada Channel.

The television broadcast in Triveneto and in western Slovenia.

Programs in Italian 
Sportissimo
Free tg
Oasi di Salute
13
La Piazza
Meteo
Parola alla Difesa
Parliamone con Kira
Info Tv
Storie di famiglia
Notes

Staff
Lorenzo Petiziol

References

External links 
Official Site 
Trieste and Slovenia

Television channels in Italy
Free-to-air
Italian-language television networks